Darzi Mahalleh may refer to:
 Darzi Mahalleh, Gilan
 Darzi Mahalleh, Babol, Mazandaran Province
 Darzi Mahalleh, Babolsar, Mazandaran Province
 Darzi Mahalleh, Neka, Mazandaran Province